Crni Vrh (Cyrillic: Црни Врх) is a village in the municipality of Konjic, Bosnia and Herzegovina.

Demographics 
According to the 2013 census, its population was nil, down from 103 in 1991.

References

Populated places in Konjic